Antoin is an Irish masculine given name that is a derivative of Antonius that is commonly used in Ireland. It may refer to:

 Antoin McFadden, Gaelic footballer
 Antoin Miliordos (1924–2012), Greek alpine skier
 Antoin Sevruguin (1851-1933), Iranian photographer
 Tony Rezko, an American businessman

See also

Antoan
 Antoine, a given name
Antolin (name)
 Anton (disambiguation)
Antonin (name)
Antoon
Antoun

Notes

Irish masculine given names